Adrian Griffiths (born 23 May 1951) is a New Zealand cricketer. He played in three first-class matches for Wellington from 1984 to 1986.

See also
 List of Wellington representative cricketers

References

External links
 

1951 births
Living people
New Zealand cricketers
Wellington cricketers
Cricketers from Blenheim, New Zealand